East Riverside-Kinghurst was an incorporated village in Kings County, New Brunswick, Canada. It was amalgamated with the town of Rothesay on January 1, 1998. Although the second half of the name was originally Kingshurst, the first 's' was dropped when the village was incorporated.

Neighbourhoods in New Brunswick
Populated places disestablished in 1998
Former villages in New Brunswick